Trespass, in law, is a civil wrong to another's property, especially land.

Trespass, Tresspasses or Trespassing may also refer to:

Film
 Trespass (1992 film), by Walter Hill
 Trespass (soundtrack)
 Trespass (film score)
 Trespass (2011 film), by Joel Schumacher

Music
 Trespass (album), 1970, by Genesis
 Trespass (band), a British heavy metal group
 Trespass (EP), 2015, by Monsta X
 "Trespasses", a 2004 song by Patti Smith
 Trespassing (album), 2012, by Adam Lambert
 "Trespassing" (song), 2012

Other uses
 Trespass (clothing), a British outdoor brand 
 Trespass (novel), 2010, by Rose Tremain

See also
 No Trespassing (disambiguation)